Menu blinking is user-interface affordance included in all versions of Mac OS. It is a visual effect which makes the selection rectangle blink on and off, indicating to the user which menu option was selected.

Only in Classic Mac OS, there have been preferences for Menu Blinking where you can control how many times the selection rectangle blinks. However, in Mac OS X there are no preference panes to control Menu Blinking and throughout Mac OS X the selection rectangle only blinks once on click.

Combo boxes and Drop down boxes(Mac OS X)
Menu Blinking is consistent in Combo Boxes, but not in Drop down boxes; reasons for this are unknown. They are likely using a different code path instead of being properly factored.

Macintosh operating systems user interface